Force of Habit is the fifth studio album by American thrash metal band Exodus, released on August 25, 1992 by Capitol Records. The sound of this album was a departure from the band's previous albums, focusing on a rather slower and experimental sound, which presented a mixture of progressive and groove metal. Many of the song titles are common figures of speech.

Force of Habit was Exodus's last release until their 1997 live album Another Lesson in Violence and their last studio album until 2004's Tempo of the Damned, as the band went on two extended hiatuses. This is Exodus's last album to feature John Tempesta on drums and is also their only album to feature Mike Butler on bass as well as the band's only release without the jagged edged "Exodus" logo that had appeared on all of the band's previous and subsequent releases. It was later re-released in 2008 in a limited edition mini-album packaging to resemble the original vinyl release, including the inner sleeve. This version was remastered and includes the bonus tracks from the Japanese release. Force of Habit was also the second and last Exodus album to include more than one cover song (the other being 1989's Fabulous Disaster).

Reception

Force of Habit received a mixed review from AllMusic's Roch Parisien, who stated that "Exodus slows the pace a notch, drops the guitars a register, and gives the thrash a little room to breathe." Guitarist Gary Holt stated on Metal Evolution that Force of Habit is his least favorite Exodus album. Martin Popoff in his Collector's Guide to Heavy Metal welcomed the slower tempos and described the album as "earth-shattering heavy" and a great improvement in "vocals, lyrics, everything".

Despite the album's mixed reception – and the fact that it did not chart on the Billboard 200 (like Exodus' previous three albums did) – the music videos for "Thorn in My Side" and "Good Day to Die" received considerable airplay by Headbangers Ball on MTV; the former was featured in "What's the Deal?", a 1995 episode of Beavis and Butt-head.

Track listing

Personnel
Exodus
 Steve "Zetro" Souza – vocals
 Gary Holt – guitars
 Rick Hunolt – guitars
 Michael Butler  – bass
 John Tempesta – drums

Additional musicians
Tower of Power Horn Section: Brandon Fields, Emilio Castillo, Greg Adams, Lee Thornburg, Stephen "Doc" Kupka – horns on track 4

Production
 Produced and engineered by Chris Tsangarides
 Assistant engineered by Chris Marshall and Sarah Bedingham
 Mixed by Steve Thompson and Michael Barbiero at Riversound, New York City
 Additional recording and remixing by Marc Senesac at The Plant, Sausalito, California
 Mastered by George Marino at Sterling Sound, New York City
Artwork by Ralph Steadman

References 

Exodus (American band) albums
Groove metal albums
1992 albums
Capitol Records albums
Albums produced by Chris Tsangarides